Newry City Athletic Football Club are a semi-professional Northern Irish football club who play in the NIFL Premiership. They are based in Newry, County Down and play at the Showgrounds. The club's colours are blue and white striped jerseys with blue shorts.

The club was created in 2013 after the city's former semi-professional club, Newry City F.C. was dissolved in September 2012, when a winding-up petition brought against the club by former player and manager Gerry Flynn was granted, and the club decided not to appeal the decision. This led to the majority of Newry City's players leaving for Warrenpoint Town. The new club, wearing the same colours and having the same home as its predecessor, is regarded as a phoenix club, but has, and claims, no legal connection to the former club business.

History

Foundation 
After the winding-up of Newry City F.C., discussions to form a new club began in December 2012. In February 2013, it was clarified that Newry City A.F.C. would be a new club and would not be liable for any debt owed by Newry City F.C. There were discussions for the club to join the Republic of Ireland's League of Ireland, however the Irish Football Association said that they would block any attempt for Newry City to join the League of Ireland. Newry City A.F.C. uses the old club's stadium, the Showgrounds, which is owned by Newry City F.C.'s season-ticket holders. This meant that it was not sold when Newry City F.C. was wound up.

Despite initial plans for the club to be named "Newry City 2012", Newry City A.F.C. was officially launched by former Newry Town player Ollie Ralph on 7 March 2013, and it was announced that they would seek to join the Irish Football Association, and play in the Intermediate B division of the Mid-Ulster Football League in the 2013–14 season. Northern Ireland manager Michael O'Neill was originally scheduled to take part in the club's launch, but was unable to attend.

Junior football from 2013
In July 2013, the club was accepted as a member of the Mid-Ulster Football League Intermediate B division for the 2013–14 season - the fifth tier of football in Northern Ireland. They won the division in their first season, gaining immediate promotion to Intermediate A (the fourth tier), which in turn they won in 2015-16 after two seasons, earning promotion to the NIFL Premier Intermediate League (the third tier). In their first season in their division, the club were runners up, qualifying for the NIFL Championship Play-Off. Over two legs, the team beat Armagh City 7-2 on aggregate to earn promotion to the NIFL Championship for the 2017-2018 season, a third promotion in four years, and confirming the return of senior league football to the city for the first time since 2011.

Senior football from 2017
The club's rise was completed in the following season, as the runners-up spot in the 2017-18 Championship, and a 6-3 aggregate win over Carrick Rangers in the NIFL Premiership Promotion-Relegation play-off saw the team reach the NIFL Premiership for the first time since its foundation, and top tier football return to the city for the first time since 2011. Relegated to the NIFL Championship the following season (2018-2019), Newry City AFC remained in the Championship during the COVID affected seasons 2019-20, and 2020–21, before earning promotion back to the Premiership, winning the Championship by six points in 2021-22. The NIFL Championship was the club's first senior title since its formation.

Rivalries

Despite its short history, the club and its fans have developed a good-natured rivalry/relationship with local neighbours Warrenpoint Town F.C., who inherited a number of players from the dissolved Newry City F.C. club and ensured senior football survived in the area after the collapse of the former club. Separated by only six miles, with Newry City's home ground, the Newry Showgrounds, on the route out of Newry toward Warrenpoint, matches between the two have been dubbed "the Mourne Ultimatum" and victory in such matches as "the Mourne Supremacy"(referencing the Jason Bourne films). Crowds at both Milltown and Newry Showgrounds for such matches have also tended to be larger than for other games. The relationship received some press attention when Warrenpoint Town, newly relegated from the NIFL Premiership sent messages of congratulation to Newry City AFC who had effectively been promoted in the other direction. The Newry club was effusive in its praise for the 'class' of their neighbours, and expressed hopes the 'Mourne Ultimatum' would soon be revived again with Warrenpoint Town returning to the NIFL Premiership.

Current squad

Honours

Senior honours
Mid-Ulster Cup: 1
2022-23
NIFL Championship: 1
2021-22

Intermediate honours
Mid Ulster Football League Intermediate A: 1
2015–16
Mid Ulster Football League Intermediate B:1
2013-14
Premier Cup:1
2015

Women's team

The women's team played its first season in 2011. They won the Division 4 in 2011 and the Division 3 in 2012. They won the Division 1 title in 2013.
The women's team was promoted to the Women's Premier League in 2014, after winning the Championship. In their 2015 Premier League season they only had 2 defeats and were second place going into the final matchday. After Linfield only drew with Glentoran United and Newry City won the team took first place and won the Premier League title.

They also reached the Irish Cup final in 2014 but lost on penalties.

References

External links
Official website
Newry City AFC on Facebook
Newry City AFC on Twitter

Association football clubs in Northern Ireland
Association football clubs established in 2013
2013 establishments in Northern Ireland
Mid-Ulster Football League clubs
Newry
Phoenix clubs (association football)
NIFL Championship clubs